StarText may refer to :
StarText – The Fort Worth Star-Telegram and Tandy Corporation service;
Programme Delivery Control – The coded teletext delivery programme called PDC/StarText.